Lekha K. C. represented Indian Women's Amateur boxing at 75 kg category and won Gold medal in 2006 Women's World Amateur Boxing Championships.

Early life 
Lekha was born in Kannur district of Kerala to M. V. Govindan Nambiar and Rohini K. C.

Career 
Lekha was trained at Sports Authority of India's centre at Kollam. She had won the National women’s boxing championship six times in succession starting from 2001. She was among the four gold medallists that won the World Championship in 2006 for India. She won the gold in 75 kg category. She had won gold in the 2005 Asian championship and silver in the 2008 Asian championship. She was awarded the Dhyan Chand award for life time achievement in the year 2021.

References 

Living people
Indian women boxers
Sportspeople from Kannur
Sportswomen from Kerala
1981 births
AIBA Women's World Boxing Championships medalists